Chalatenango is a municipality located in the Department of Chalatenango, in the north of El Salvador.

The municipality
Chalatenango is a department, a municipality, and a city (the capital of the Department of Chalatenango), located in the North of El Salvador. In 2005 the population of the municipality was 30,671 inhabitants. Its territory is approximately 131.05 km2 rural land and approximately 75 km2 urban land. The municipality has six “cantons” and 36 “caseríos”.

Its population was founded in Pre-Columbian times by Lenca tribes, but by the end of the 19th century was controlled by the Yaquis, or Pipiles tribes. 

The name Chalatenango derives from the náhuat words chal (sand), at (water or river), and tenango (valley): thus the name means “valley of water and sands."

History
The civilization of El Salvador dates from the Pre-Columbian era, from around 1500 BC, according to experts. On May 31, 1522, the first of the Spanish, under the leadership of Captain Pedro de Alvarado, disembarked on the Isla Meanguera, located in the Gulf of Fonseca. In June 1524 Captain Alvarado began a war of conquest against the indigenous people of Cuzcatlán (land of precious things). After 17 days of bloody battles many people died, but the Spanish were not defeated, so they continued their conquest. 

During the following centuries the Spanish maintained their control, with European families controlling the land and the natives of the area. Towards the end of 1810 the priest José Matías Delgado, with the support of many people, began a rebellion (embajada). After years of struggle, the Central American Independence Act was signed in Guatemala, on September 15, 1821.

In 1550 Chalatenango had 600 inhabitants. The mayor of San Salvador, don Manuel de Gálvez de Corral, wrote that in 1740 San Juan Chalatenango had about 125 inhabitants and 25 heads of tributary indigenous families. He claimed that the area was “very hot and healthy.” In 1770, according to Archbishop don Pedro Cortes de Larraz, Chalatenango was the capital of the large villages of Arcatao, Concepción Quezaltepeque and Techonchogo (today San Miguel de Mercedes), plus 56 haciendas and prosperous valleys and other small villages.

On February 16, 1831, in the State of San Salvador, the title of “villa” was conferred to Chalatenango, in recognition of the important services given by this area in the process of independence and the armed struggles of 1827 and 1829 that ended in the reestablishment of constitutional order in Central America (Plan Estratégico de Desarrollo Municipal de Chalatenango).

Due to repression from the landowners, in 1931 farmers and indigenous citizens began a rebellion  The army responded by killing 30,000 people, including the leader of the rebellion, Farabundo Martí, in bloody violence that was later referred to as La Matanza. But the people remained unhappy with the government. This began a movement organized around leftist guerrillas to combat the repression violence. The government responded with violence, and the death squads were formed, which eventually tortured and killed thousands of people. More political instability, and the assassination of Archbishop Oscar Romero in 1980, sparked the beginning of the Salvadoran Civil War. This war, which lasted twelve years, resulted in the deaths of an estimated 75,000 people and the displacement of thousands more. The Peace Accords were signed on January 16, 1992.

The department of Chalatenango was heavily impacted by the civil war. Many people of Chalatenango were forced to abandon their homes because of the violence. But beginning the early 1990s, and especially after the peace accords, people have returned to repopulate the municipality.

Politics
There are two main political parties in El Salvador, whose roots lie in the Civil War. The main right-wing party, La Alianza Republicana Nacionalista (Nationalist Republican Alliance—ARENA), founded on September 30, 1981,  was in power during the last few wars of the Civil War. The Frente Farabundo Marti para La Liberacion Nacional (Farabundo Martí National Liberation Front—FMLN)
the socialist party, is the direct descendant of the guerrilla troops that fought against the Salvadoran government, and was legally constituted as a political party on September 1, 1992. Since the Civil War the two have remained the country's principal political parties, still divided by the left-right binary. Today ARENA describes itself as a party in whose “forming principals express that a democratic and representational system, which guarantees the freedom of action and the consequences of individual peaceful goals, are the quickest and stablest path to achieve integral development of the nation”. The FMLN “has begun to take steps…to act as a consequence of the historically created challenges, in order to make the party an organization of ‘social fighters…’and ‘to unify more’ the struggle for power. Other political parties in El Salvador include The Christian Democratic Party, The United Democratic Center, and The Party of National Coalition.

The mayor of Chalatenango is Rigoberto Mejia, of the ARENA party.

Religion

About 47% of the population of El Salvador identifies as Roman Catholic, and another 38% identify as Protestant. But in the last few years the population of Catholicism has been reduced (USBDHRL). There is a lot of Protestant activity in the country, and El Salvador has one of the highest rates of Protestantism in Latin America. 

Religion plays an important role in the lives of many people. Patron-saint and other religious festivals are still very important and celebrated in almost all of the municipalities in the country, and almost all the cantones have their own patron-saint with their own festival.

Patron saint festivals
Urban Center: June 23 and 24, in honor of St. John the Baptist
Barrio San Antonio: January 16–17, in honor of St. Anthony of Padua
Barrio La Sierpe: November 21, in honor of the Our Lady of Peace
Barrio El Chile: December 30, a traditional festival
Colonia Fátima: May 13, in honor of the Virgin Fatima
Colonia Veracruz: May 3, in honor of the Holy Cross
Barrio el Calvario: last Saturday of January, in honor of the Virgin of Mercy
Upatoro: February 28, in honor of Saint Roch
Caserío El Chuptal: January 30, in honor of St. Charalambos
Reubicación No. 1: January 15–18, in honor of the Black Christ of Esquipulas.
Reubicación No. 2: October 14–15, in honor of St. Teresa de Jesús
Reubicación No 3: December 7–8, in honor of the Immaculate Conception.
Caserío Tepeyac: December 12, in honor of the Virgin of Guadalupe
Guarjila: October 4, in honor of Francis of Assisi
-February 15-15, a traditional festival, 
-October 10–12, to celebrate the repopulation of the village after the inhabitants relocated in 1987.
Caserío de Guancora: May 29, in honor of Our Lady of the Rosary
Cantón Las Minas: December 8, in honor of the Immaculate Conception
Caserío El Jìcaro: February 13, in honor of St. Anthony of Padua
Cantón San José: March 19, in honor of Saint Joseph

Music

In the San Antonio neighborhood people traditionally took drums to the street and played. This tradition was not confined to just one neighborhood, since drum music was heard all over during festivals. There were also instruments made by the people themselves from avocado tree wood and leather.

In past times the most popular types of music have been  valses, corridos, and rancheras, and popular instruments were drums, marimbas, guitars, violins, accordions, and maracas. This music is no longer heard very often.

Traditional dances

Cumbia dance

When people used to dance to corrido music they danced separately. Another popular traditional dance was the zafacaite. 

One of the traditional dances that the people used to dance was “los indios Calvareños,” (the Calvareño Indians), which was always done during the same month as the patron-saint festivals of the El Calvario neighborhood. It was a very happy and widely accepted dance, even though some of the people did not know what it really meant but nevertheless identified it as part of the municipal identity, and specifically as part of the identity of the people of El Calvario.

Agriculture
The most ancient crop cultivated is indigo. In fact, the entire department of Chalatenango was one of the biggest producers of indigo, as demonstrated by the large number of former manufacturing plants found throughout the municipality. In some places only the foundations remain, but others are regularly maintained and conserved.

Other traditional crops that are important to local diets are corn, beans, sorghum (maicillo), native squash, rice, and vegetables. These crops essentially serve for family consumption, but in some cases the families sell them either directly or through intermediaries.

The population has become based more on livestock then on production of grains. On Tuesdays there is a market where people sell livestock, mostly cattle. There are also local artisanal dairy products, although the milk production is mostly sold to intermediaries from Apopa or San Salvador.

Food and drink

Traditional foods include beans, tortillas, metas, soups, sweets, and seeds. Other traditional foods and dishes include:
Pupusas (a stuffed corn tortilla) filled with various local vegetables.
“Chalateco gum,” a mix of toasted peanut and pipían (a local squash) seeds.
Tamales of tender corn and tamales pisque.
Traditional candies, many of which are still made in San José.
Zorrillo is the name of a dish of freshly cooked beans with tender mango.
Chilate is atole (a drink made out of milk and corn) with yucca, eggs, or flour, and much honey or sugar.
Mogo is a dish made out of tender green bananas, ground then fried with either salt or sugar.

During Easter week the traditional food is: 
fish soup, chilate, mangos with honey, and jocotes (a small local fruit) in honey.
Sweet atole made out of whatever fruit is in season, such as mango or pineapple, and corn.
Traditional breads, such as quesadillas, salpores, and marquezote.

The majority of the ingredients used to make these foods and drinks are natural and are grown in the area. They also form part of the biodiversity that, in some cases, is threatened or in danger of extinction. Nevertheless, these habits are less common as more people eat commercially produced foods.

Sports
The department of Chalatenango is home to the soccer team “Chalatenango FC: los duros del Norte.” The soccer stadium, Estadio Gregorio Martinez, is located in the municipality of Chalatenango a few miles outside of the city.

In summer of 2009, Chalatenango FC were suddenly closed down after selling their place in the Premier Division (LMF) to Municipal Limeño, a team from eastern El Salvador.

However, when the mayor of Nejapa refused the team from his city permission to play their games at the municipal stadium, the team and its staff received permission to host games at the Gregorio Martinez Stadium in Chalatenango. After playing for two months under the name of Nejapa, the team exchanged their red-and-white striped shirts for the purple-and-white colours of Chalatenango.

In 2010, the team applied to change its name from Nejapa to Alacranes del Norte (Northern Scorpions), but they have yet to receive official clearance to do this.

References

Bibliography

NOTE: Unless otherwise cited, all information extracted from Martínez Alas et al. "Diagnostico Cultural Municipio de Chalatenango, 2005." Reprinted with express permission of the Unidad Tecnica Intermunicipal de La Mancomunidad la Montañona, who commissioned the report.
ARENA. 2007. “Nuestra Historia.” [Online] https://web.archive.org/web/20040320053204/http://www.arena.com.sv/. Retrieved December 6, 2007.
CIA World Factbook. November 15, 2007. “El Salvador.” [Online]. https://www.cia.gov/ library/publications/the-world-factbook/geos/es.html. Retrieved December 5, 2007.
Comisión Nacional de Educación Política. 2002. “Historia del FMLN.” [Online] https://web.archive.org/web/20071207092942/http://fmln.org.sv/portal/index.php?module=htmlpages&func=display&pid=1. Retrieved December 6, 2007.
Embajada de El Salvador en EE. UU. (Embajada), De la Civilización a la Independencia. [Online]. https://web.archive.org/web/20080120012009/http://www.elsalvador.org/home.nsf. Retrieved December 4, 2007.
Foley, Michael W. 2006. Laying the Groundwork: The Struggle for Civil Society in El Salvador. Journal of Interamerican Studies and World Affairs. 38 (1): 67-104.
Lonely Planet. “El Salvador Background Information.” [Online]. https://web.archive.org/web/20071008200023/http://www.lonelyplanet.com/worldguide/destinations/central-america/el-salvador/essential?a=culture. Retrieved December 3, 2007.
Martínez Alas, José Salomón, Aguilardo Pérez Yancky, Ismael Ernesto Crespín Rivera, and Deysi Ester Cierra Anaya. 2005. “Diagnostico Cultural Municipio de Chalatenango, 2005.” El Instituo para Rescate Ancestral Indígena (RAIS): El Salvador.
Stahler-Sholk, Richard. 1994. El Salvador's Negotiated Transition: From Low-Intensity Conflict to Low-IntensityDemocracy. Journal of Interamerican Studies and World Affairs. 36 (4): 1-59.
US Bureau of Democracy, Human Rights, and Labor (USBHRL). November 8, 2005. “International Religious Freedom Report 2005.”

Municipalities of the Chalatenango Department